Sankt Veit im Pongau is a market town in the St. Johann im Pongau district in the Austrian state of Salzburg. St.Veit is the first healthy climate spa town in Salzburg. Submontane to the "Hochglocker" there is the 1912 founded sanatorium. Author Thomas Bernhard was treated in there and he also wrote a book about his residence at the clinic.

Geography
The municipality lies in the Pongau on the Salzach. Until Sankt Veit, the Salzach flows from west to east; after Sankt Veit, it flow north. The municipality lies on a high plateau. The climate is tempered by winds that come from the valleys to the south.

References

Cities and towns in St. Johann im Pongau District